Kadayampatti is a town panchayat and headquarters of Kadayampatti taluk, in Salem district, Tamil Nadu, India.

Geography
Kadayampatti is within Kadayampatti taluk, which in the northern part of Salem district. National Highway 44 passes to the west of the town.

Demographics
In 2011 Kadayampatti had a population of 11,390 people living in 2,857 households. 5,920 (51.98%) of the inhabitants were male, while 5,470 (48.02%) were female. 1,229 children in the town, about 10.8% of the population, were at or below the age of 6. 62.2% of the population was literate. Scheduled Castes and Scheduled Tribes accounted for about 37.3% and 0.18% of the population, respectively.

References

Cities and towns in Salem district